James Hugh McMenamin  (26 May 191013 August 2000) was a cricket umpire who officiated at Test level.

Biography
McMenamin was born in Paddington, New South Wales in 1910. He died in Balgowlah, New South Wales in 2000.

While studying at the University of Sydney he played rugby league in the NSWRFL, for University, Balmain and Newtown.

During the Second World War McMenamin served in the South African Army in Europe. He was awarded a Military Cross for service in Italy.

Umpiring
McMenamin umpired 10 first class cricket matches, including four Tests, between 1956 and 1960.

References

1910 births
2000 deaths
Australian cricket umpires
Cricketers from Sydney
South African Test cricket umpires
South African Army officers
Recipients of the Military Cross
Sportspeople from Sydney
Balmain Tigers players
Newtown Jets players
Sydney University rugby league team players
Australian rugby league players
South African military personnel of World War II
Rugby league players from Sydney
Rugby league forwards